In 2000 the British Canoe Union (BCU) federalised to become the umbrella organisation for the Home Nation Associations in Scotland (Scottish Canoe Association - SCA), Wales (Canoe Wales) and Northern Ireland (Canoe Association of Northern Ireland - CANI).

In England, Canoe England was set up similarly to the other National Associations, as a division of the BCU, to support the development of canoeing specifically in England.

In 2014 the British Canoe Union was renamed as British Canoeing.

External links
BCU Official Website Archived from the original on 2015-10-16
Canoe England website Archived from the original on 2016-05-02
Canoe Foundation - Official Charity Partner of the BCU and Home Nation Associations
Scottish Canoe Association
Canoe Wales
Canoe Association of Northern Ireland
GB Canoeing
International Canoe Federation

Sports governing bodies in England
Canoe organizations
2000 establishments in England
Sports organizations established in 2000
Canoeing in the United Kingdom
Canoeing in England